Historical or period drama is a film genre in which stories are based on historical events and famous persons. Some historical dramas attempt to accurately portray a historical event or biography, to the degree that the available historical research will allow. Other historical dramas are fictionalised tales that are based on an actual person and their deeds.

Due to the sheer volume of films included in this genre and in the interest of continuity, this list is primarily focused on films pertaining to the history of East Asia, Central Asia, and India. For films pertaining to the history of Near Eastern and Western civilisation, please refer to list of historical period drama films and series set in Near Eastern and Western civilization.

The films on this page are divided into regions, and within each region the films are listed chronologically by subject matter.

Central Asia

South Asia

Indian subcontinent history

Pakistani history

Sri Lankan history

East Asia

Chinese and Taiwanese history

Japanese history

Samurai cinema and Jidai-geki films

Jidai-geki 時代劇 is a genre of film, television, and theatre in Japan. Literally "period dramas", they are most often set during the Edo period of Japanese history, from 1603 to 1868.  Some, however, are set much earlier—Portrait of Hell, for example, is set during the late Heian period—and the early Meiji era is also a popular setting. Jidaigeki show the lives of the samurai, farmers, craftsmen, and merchants of their time. Jidaigeki films are sometimes referred to as chambara movies, a word meaning "sword fight", though chambara is more accurately a subgenre of jidaigeki, which equates to historical period drama. In Japan, the term , also commonly spelled "chambara", meaning "sword fighting" movies, denotes the genre called samurai cinema in English, and is roughly equivalent to western cowboy and swashbuckler films. Jidaigeki may refer to a story set in a historical period, though not necessarily dealing with a samurai character or depicting swordplay. Jidaigeki rely on an established set of dramatic conventions including the use of makeup, language, catchphrases, and plotlines.

Gendai-geki films
Gendai-geki (現劇) is a genre of film and television or theater play in Japan. Unlike the jidai-geki genre of period dramas, whose stories are set in the Edo period, gendaigeki stories are contemporary dramas set in the modern world.

Korean and South Korean history

Southeast Asia

Philippine history

Mainland and Maritime Southeast Asia

See also
 Lists of historical films
 List of Vietnamese historical drama films
 List of Russian historical films
 List of films based on actual events
 List of war films and TV specials
 List of World War II films
 Asian period drama films
 Jidaigeki
 Samurai cinema

References

 
 
 
 Historical, Asia
 Historical, Asia
 Historical, Asia
 Historical, Asia
 Historical, Asia
 Historical, Asia
Histortical
Asia
Asia Historical
History of Sri Lanka on film
Films set in Sri Lanka